True Love Requited, or the Bailiff's Daughter of Islington is an English broadside ballad from the 17th century. It tells the story of a young couple from Islington who are separated by a seven-year apprenticeship, only to encounter each other once more along the road to London and live happily ever after. Copies of the broadside can be found in the British Library, the National Library of Scotland, and Magdalene College, Cambridge. Facsimile transcriptions are also available on-line for public consumption.

Synopsis 
This ballad tells the story of a squire's son who falls in love with a bailiff's daughter in Islington. She remains coy and won't requite his love at first. His friends send him to London to become an apprentice. Seven years later, when everybody in Islington goes to a local festival, the girl dresses in "puggish" attire and runs away to London. On the road to London, she runs into the squire's son riding back to Islington. She asks him for a copper and he asks her if she knows the bailiff's daughter. She tells him that the bailiff's daughter has been dead for years and he swears to sell his horse and run off somewhere where nobody can find him. She begs him not to and reveals herself as still alive. He is happier for this news after thinking she was dead, and they are married.

Cultural and historical significance 
The Bailiff's Daughter of Islington became an important British folk song, recorded by a number of artists.

Folk Recordings 
 Hermes Nye on Anglo-American Ballads (1952)
 Richard Dyer-Bennet on Dyer-Bennett Vol. 2 (1956)
 Tony Wales on Sussex Folk Songs and Ballads (1957)
 Paul Clayton on Folk Ballads of the English Speaking World (1956)
 Dusky Ruthe recorded it as a single (1970)
 Jon Rennard on Brimbledon Fair (1970)
 Tania Opland and Mike Freeman on Choice Fare (2000)
 Owen Brannigan and Elizabeth Harwood on Heart of Oak: Songs and Folksongs of the British Isles (2004)
 Tanya Brody on Not Your Average...Anything (2004)
 Laura Cortese on Hush (2004)
 Bob Lewis on Drive Sorrows Away (Live, 2008)
 Jim and Mindy on Music For Relaxation Featuring the Recorder'' (2012)

References

External links 
 www.example.com

17th-century broadside ballads